The north-western sandy-loam ctenotus (Ctenotus serventyi)  is a species of skink found in Western Australia.

References

serventyi
Reptiles described in 1975
Taxa named by Glen Milton Storr